Christiane Papon (3 September 1924 – 8 January 2023) was an Austrian-born French politician.

Papon was born on 3 September 1924 in Vienna, Austria. Papon was a member of the Rally for the Republic (RPR), and led its women's wing, Femme Avenir, from 1975 to 1988. She was elected to the National Assembly in 1986 via proportional representation, as a member of the RFR from Val-de-Marne. She represented Val-de-Marne's 1st constituency from 1988, and served until 1993. While a member of the National Assembly, Papon also sat on the European Parliament, representing France from 1987 to 1989.

Papon was designated commander of the Legion of Honor in 2000, and awarded the Grand Cross of the National Order of Merit in 2008.

Papon died in Neuilly-sur-Seine on 8 January 2023, at the age of 98.

References

1924 births
2023 deaths
20th-century French women
Austrian emigrants to France
Rally for the Republic politicians
Rally for the Republic MEPs
Women members of the National Assembly (France)
Deputies of the 8th National Assembly of the French Fifth Republic
Deputies of the 9th National Assembly of the French Fifth Republic
MEPs for France 1984–1989
Women MEPs for France
Politicians from Vienna
Members of Parliament for Val-de-Marne
Commandeurs of the Légion d'honneur
Grand Cross of the Ordre national du Mérite